1927 renumbering can refer to:
1927 New Jersey state highway renumbering
1927 Ohio state highway renumbering